Supay Q'asa (Quechua supay devil, demon, q'asa mountain pass, "devil's pass" also spelled Supay Khasa) is a mountain in the Bolivian Andes which reaches a height of approximately . It is located in the Chuquisaca Department, Tomina Province, Sopachuy Municipality. It lies at the Supay Q'asa River.

References 

Mountains of Chuquisaca Department